Kim Joong-eop (1922–1988) was a prominent Korean architect and educator. He was born in Pyongyang as the second son of his father, Kim Yeong-pil (金永弼) and his mother, Yi Yeong-ja (李英子). He had six siblings; four brothers, and two sisters. He spent his childhood in various places such as Gangdong, Junghwa, Seongcheon and others due to his father's job as the country headman of the places. Kim was awarded the 1962 Cultural Award from Seoul Metropolitan Government in 1962, Chevalier from the France government in 1965, Order of Industrial Service Merit from the South Korea government in 1985.

He designed the Main Gate and a memorial hall at the United Nations Memorial Cemetery in Busan.

See also
Kim Swoo Geun
Architecture of South Korea
31 Building

References

External links
Kim chung-up Architecture Museum

1922 births
1988 deaths
South Korean architects
People from Pyongyang
Deaths from liver cancer
Recipients of the Order of Industrial Service Merit
20th-century Korean architects
Academic staff of Seoul National University
Academic staff of Hongik University